Mykhaylo Pysko (born 19 March 1993) is a Ukrainian football defender who plays for Prykarpattia Ivano-Frankivsk.

Career
Pysko is the son of the Ukrainian football youth coach and former player Mykhaylo Pysko. He is a product of the UFK Lviv youth sportive school and signed a contract with FC Shakhtar Donetsk in the Ukrainian Premier League in 2011.

He played 3 years for the FC Shakhtar Donetsk Reserves and Youth Team in the Ukrainian Premier League Reserves Championship and in July 2014 went on loan to FC Zorya in the Ukrainian Premier League. Pysko made his debut for FC Zorya playing full-time in a match against FC Olimpik Donetsk on 3 August 2014 in the Ukrainian Premier League.

References

External links

1993 births
Living people
Ukrainian footballers
Association football defenders
Ukrainian Premier League players
Ukrainian First League players
Ukrainian expatriate footballers
Expatriate footballers in Belarus
Ukrainian expatriate sportspeople in Belarus
FC Shakhtar Donetsk players
FC Zorya Luhansk players
FC Hoverla Uzhhorod players
FC Mariupol players
FC Gomel players
FC Rukh Lviv players
FC Inhulets Petrove players
FC Belshina Bobruisk players
FC Ahrobiznes Volochysk players
FC Kramatorsk players
FC Prykarpattia Ivano-Frankivsk (1998) players
Sportspeople from Lviv Oblast